John Polk, commonly known as Captain Citrus, is a promotional character made by Marvel Comics that debuted in 2014. The series, Avengers Assemble, Featuring Captain Citrus, promotes healthy living to young children. The series was written by Ralph Macchio.

Captain Citrus gets his powers from solar pods that harness the power of the sun. He is seen making energy shields, blasts similar and is based out of Central Florida.

Other Media 
Captain Citrus appears in his own website.  On the website, he gives further tips to children on how to stay healthy. Children can also download word searches, cross word puzzles, coloring sheets, and other pages featuring Captain Citrus.

References

Marvel Comics characters